Ərəbşahverdi (also, Arabshakhverdi) is a village in the Goychay Rayon of Azerbaijan.    The village forms part of the municipality of Mallı-Şıxlı.

References

External links
Map of the rayon at the rayon's official website

Populated places in Goychay District